Choreutis ialeura is a species of moth of the family Choreutidae described by Edward Meyrick in 1912. It is found in China, India, Sri Lanka, Nepal and Mauritius.

The larvae have been recorded feeding on Malus pumila.

References

Choreutis
Moths of Asia
Moths of Mauritius
Moths described in 1912